The Koons House is a historic house at 409 Fifth Street NW in Bentonville, Arkansas.  It is an unusually high-quality and well-preserved example of a once-common local vernacular form called the "gumdrop duple", a two-family residence with a pyramidal roof.  The front facade has a single-story hip-roofed porch supported by tapered square columns, and there is a shed-roof addition across the rear.  The roof is not fully pyramidal, having small gable sections near the peak that provide ventilation.  The house was built c. 1908, and is a slightly larger version of the traditional form.

The house was listed on the National Register of Historic Places in 1988.

See also
National Register of Historic Places listings in Benton County, Arkansas

References

Houses on the National Register of Historic Places in Arkansas
Houses completed in 1908
Houses in Bentonville, Arkansas
National Register of Historic Places in Bentonville, Arkansas
1908 establishments in Arkansas